Finn-Egil Eckblad (1923 – 2000) was a Norwegian mycologist.

He took the Dr.philos. degree in 1968, was hired as a lecturer at the University of Bergen in 1971 and as a professor at the University of Oslo in 1979. He retired in 1990.

He was the brother of the actress Edel Eckblad.

References

1923 births
2000 deaths
Norwegian mycologists
Academic staff of the University of Bergen
Academic staff of the University of Oslo
20th-century Norwegian botanists